Collegiate and University yearbooks, also called annuals, have been published by the student bodies or administration of most such schools in the United States. Because of rising costs and limited interest, many have been discontinued: From 1995 to 2013, the number of U.S. college yearbooks dropped from roughly 2,400 to 1,000. 
This is a partial list of those yearbooks that have been made available for digital search and download via their school libraries or archives.

United States

Notes

See also
The Hathi Trust Digital Library provides many yearbook collections online, if colleges and universities are member institutions.  Some otherwise unavailable collegiate yearbooks are available via subscription service through Ancestry.com.  Commercial services such as e-yearbook.com may also be a resource.

A 2021 resource, listing multiple collegiate and high school yearbooks by state is The Ancestor Hunt - there may be some duplication between this resource and those in the table above.

References

Yearbooks
yearbooks